Connestee Falls and Batson Creek Falls are two waterfalls in Western North Carolina, located near Brevard.

Geology
Batson Creek flows less than 1 mile from its source, feeding two manmade lakes along the way.  It meets Carson Creek at a point where both Batson Creek and Carson Creek fall over bedrock.  The falls meet in an area called "The Silver Slip" before continuing on down Carson Creek.

Natural history
The falls were supposedly named for a Native American princess named "Connestee" in 1882 by Dr. F. A. Miles, owner of the Caesar's Head Hotel.

A legend is told that the princess lost her life at the falls due to a relationship with an Englishman.

Visiting the Falls
The falls were recently closed to the public until April 16, 2011, when a new, handicapped accessible, county park was unveiled. The parking lot for the falls is found by traveling on U.S. Highway 276, 6 miles south of the intersection of 276, U.S. Highway 64, and NC Highway 280 in Brevard, North Carolina. From the viewing platform, you stand at the top of Connestee Falls and watch it just below your feet. In front of you is Batson Falls, which is located on private property within the Connestee Falls Community

Nearby Falls
High Falls
Hooker Falls
Bridal Veil Falls
Wintergreen Falls
Triple Falls
Key Falls
Glen Cannon Falls
Turley Falls

External links
 North Carolina Waterfalls - Connestee and Batson Creek Falls

References

Protected areas of Transylvania County, North Carolina
Waterfalls of North Carolina
DuPont State Forest
Waterfalls of Transylvania County, North Carolina